Bongoville is a town in southeastern Gabon, east of Franceville. It was known as Lewai until it was renamed for President Omar Bongo, who was born in what was then a village but was greatly enlarged under his presidency. It is just west of the Bateke Plateau and is home to Stade de Bongoville, a 2,500-capacity stadium where the city's AC Bongoville football club plays its home games.

Populated places in Haut-Ogooué Province